The following pages list the power stations in the United Kingdom, by region:
 List of power stations in England
 List of power stations in Northern Ireland
 List of power stations in Scotland
 List of power stations in Wales

The following page lists the power stations in the British Crown Dependencies (Guernsey, Jersey and the Isle of Man):

 List of power stations in the British Crown Dependencies

The following pages list the power stations in the United Kingdom, by source:

Non-renewable energy
 List of active coal fired power stations in the United Kingdom
 List of active gas fired power stations in the United Kingdom
 List of commercial nuclear reactors in the United Kingdom

Renewable energy
 List of onshore wind farms in the United Kingdom
 List of offshore wind farms in the United Kingdom
 Hydroelectric power stations in the United Kingdom
 Geothermal power stations in the United Kingdom